Air Tractor Inc. is a United States aircraft manufacturer based in Olney, Texas. Founded in 1978, the company began manufacturing a new agricultural aircraft derived from the S-2B aircraft (designed by founder Leland Snow's previous company, Snow Aeronautical). Designated Model AT-300 Air Tractor, the new aircraft first flew in 1973.

History
Leland Snow began designing his first airplane, the S-1, in 1951. The 23-year-old Snow completed test flights with the S-1 in 1953. Snow's S-1 flew dusting and spraying jobs in the Texas Rio Grande Valley and in Nicaragua until 1957. He followed-up the S-1 with the models S-2A and S-2B, which were built when Snow moved to production facilities in Olney, Texas in 1958.

In 1965, Leland Snow sold his company to Rockwell-Standard and was appointed a Vice President of the Aero Commander division. During this time, the Model S-2R was developed and named the Thrush. The first 100 Thrush aircraft were built at the Olney Division before the plant was closed and Thrush production moved to Georgia in 1970. More than 500 aircraft were produced under Snow Aeronautical Corporation and Rockwell-Standard in Olney.

Snow resigned from Rockwell and devoted the next two years designing the Air Tractor. Construction on the AT-300, which later became the AT-301, began in 1972. Air Tractor's first turbine model, the AT-302, was introduced in 1977.

Sixteen years later, Air Tractor delivered its 1,100th airplane and soon began expanding the Olney plant for increased capacity. Today, Air Tractor produces a line of aircraft that includes  capacity planes powered by Pratt & Whitney piston or turbine engines.

Aircraft

See also
 Ayres Corporation
 Snow Aeronautical
 Thrush Aircraft

References

Further reading

External links 

 Air Tractor (Official website)
 Air Tractor Europe (Official website)

Aircraft manufacturers of the United States
Companies based in Texas
1978 establishments in Texas
American companies established in 1978
Manufacturing companies established in 1978